Skua is a seabird in the family Stercorariidae.

Skua may also refer to:
 Blackburn Skua, a British dive-bomber/fighter plane from World War II
 Colonel Luis Arturo Rodríguez Meneses Air Base, a military base, with ICAO airport code SKUA, assigned to the Colombian Air Force 
 Juvenelle Rosario Skua, Brazilian motorglider (aircraft)
 Orkney Skua, a British-manufactured sailing dinghy
 Skua Sailing Dinghy, a drop-keel two-person racing sailboat, designed for construction from plywood.
 Sea Skua, a British air-to-surface missile
 Skua (rocket), a British sounding rocket
 Denel Dynamics Skua, a South African high-speed target drone

See also
 SCUA, the Scottish Conservative & Unionist Party
 Skewer (disambiguation)